Rodrigo Andrés Brito Tobar (born 23 February 1983) is a Chilean footballer that currently plays for the Chilean Segunda División División Profesional club Deportes Limache as centre back.

Career
A historical player of both Deportes La Serena and Deportes Iquique, he left the first at the end of the 2022 season and joined Deportes Limache for 2023.

Honours
Deportes Iquique
 Copa Chile: 2010
 Primera B: 2010

References

External links
 
 

1983 births
Living people
Footballers from Santiago
Chilean footballers
Deportes La Serena footballers
Curicó Unido footballers
Deportes Iquique footballers
Rangers de Talca footballers
Deportes Limache footballers
Chilean Primera División players
Primera B de Chile players
Segunda División Profesional de Chile players
Association football central defenders